The Hazur Sahib Nanded–Shri Ganganagar Weekly Express is an Express train belonging to South Central Railway zone that runs between  and Shri Ganganagar Junction railway station in India. It is currently being operated with 17623/17624 train numbers on a weekly basis.

Service

The 17623/Hazur Sahib Nanded–Shri Ganganagar Weekly Express has an average speed of 50.5 km/hr and covers 1992 km in 39h 25m.

The 17624/Shri Ganganagar–Hazur Sahib Nanded Weekly Express has an average speed of 50.5 km/hr and covers 1992 km in 40h 30m.

Route and halts 

The important halts of the train are:

Coach composition

The train has standard ICF rakes with a max speed of 110 kmph. The train consists of 18 coaches:

 1 AC II Tier
 2 AC III Tier
 7 Sleeper coaches
 6 General Unreserved
 2 Seating cum Luggage Rake

Traction

Both trains are hauled by a Diesel Loco Shed, Moula Ali WDP-4D diesel locomotive from Nanded to Bikaner and vice versa.

Direction reversal

Train reverses its direction 1 times:

See also 

 Hazur Sahib Nanded railway station
 Shri Ganganagar Junction railway station

Notes

References

External links 

 17623/Hazur Sahib Nanded–Shri Ganganagar Weekly Express India Rail Info
 17624/Shri Ganganagar–Hazur Sahib Nanded Weekly Express India Rail Info

Transport in Nanded
Express trains in India
Rail transport in Maharashtra
Rail transport in Gujarat
Rail transport in Rajasthan
Railway services introduced in 2015
Transport in Sri Ganganagar